Arnage is a commune in the Sarthe department in the administrative region of Pays de la Loire, north-western France.

Population

See also
Communes of the Sarthe department

References

Communes of Sarthe